Ten Sports is a Pakistan sports channel owned by Tower Sports Private Limited subsidiary of Sony. It mainly broadcasts Cricket, Football, Mixed martial arts, Tennis.

History 
On 1 April 2002, the Dubai-based Taj Television company launched the channel as Ten Sports in India and Pakistan.

In 2006, Indian Essel Group bought the Ten Sports channel and made it a part of its Zee Network. However, Ten Sports Channel in Pakistan was handed over to a company called Tower Two which was an Essel Group's subsidiary.

In 2016, Ten Sports was bought by UK-based Japan's Sony subsidiary company  formed called Tower Sports Private Limited to operate Ten Sports In Pakistan.

Pakistan Electronic Media Regulatory Authority (PEMRA) documents reveal Tower Sports applied for the renewal of landing rights permission for the channel Ten Sports on June 29, 2018, as their permission was expiring later that year. In December 2018, PEMRA awarded Landing Right Permission (LRD) to Tower Sports for "Ten Sports 2" channel in Pakistan. In 2019, Ten Sports launched its website. In February 2020, Pakistan Cricket Board (PCB) appointed Tower Sports to handle broadcast production for the 2020 Pakistan Super League, the first edition of the PSL to be played entirely in Pakistan.
On The 5th July 2022, Ten Sports convert its transmission into High Definition

Programming 
Ten Sports HD is one of the most popular sports channel in Asia. It has broadcasting rights for many sporting events, including Cricket, Football, MMA and Tennis. In Cricket, Ten Sports Pakistan has Australia Cricket, England Cricket and Sri Lanka Cricket rights. In Football, Ten Sports has UEFA rights, Including UEFA Champions League, UEFA Europa League, Bundesliga rights. FA Cup rights. In Mixed martial arts Ten Sports has UFC rights, and it also has the rights of most popular MMA in Pakistan WWE since 2002 which is renewed after every five years. In Tennis Ten Sports has Australian Open rights. It also has French Open rights.

Asian Games

Continental Cricket

Country Cricket

Country Professional Cricket Leagues

Continental Football

Country Domestic Football Leagues

Country Professional Football Leagues

Country Mixed Martial Arts

Country Grand Slam Tennis

Professional wrestling
 WWE (2002–present)

References 

Sports television in Pakistan